The Kirk Party were a radical Presbyterian faction of the Scottish Covenanters during the Wars of the Three Kingdoms. They came to the fore after the defeat of the Engagers faction in 1648 at the hands of Oliver Cromwell and the English Parliament. They purged the Covenanter's General Assembly and army of "ungodly elements" and crowned Charles II as King of Scotland in 1651, in return for his explicit endorsement of their religious and political agenda in the Treaty of Breda (1650). 

Kirk is a Scottish word meaning a church, or more specifically, the Church of Scotland. 

The Kirk party's religious zeal did not help their cause militarily. In the month before the Battle of Dunbar they chose to institute a searching three-day examination of the political and religious sentiments of the Scottish army. The result was that the army was purged of "Malignants", 80 officers and 3000 experienced soldiers, while it lay within musket shot of the enemy. Their ranks were to some extent made up with replacements with strong spiritual beliefs but little military experience. The Kirk party were therefore discredited when their army was routed by Cromwell's New Model Army at the Battle of Dunbar, in September 1650.

Thereafter, a more representative faction came to the fore in Scottish politics, which tried to reconcile (at least temporarily) the different factions of the Covenanters and Scottish Royalists to resist the English Parliamentarian invasion of Scotland. However, they in turn were defeated at the battle of Worcester in 1651, leading eventually to Scotland's annexation into the English Commonwealth.

The Kirk party were disparagingly called "whiggamores" or "whigs" by their Scottish opponents (See the Whiggamore Raid). The nickname was later applied (equally offensively) to those, headed by Anthony Ashley Cooper, Earl of Shaftesbury, calling for the exclusion of James, Duke of York from the English throne on the grounds of his Catholicism.

References

See also
History of Scotland
Scotland in the Wars of the Three Kingdoms

Wars of the Three Kingdoms
Political history of Scotland
Defunct political parties in Scotland
Christian political parties in the United Kingdom
Protestant political parties
Presbyterianism in Scotland
 
1647 establishments in Scotland
Political parties established in 1647
1651 disestablishments in Scotland
Political parties disestablished in 1651
Presbyterian organizations
Political party factions in Scotland